Clara Wu Tsai is an American businesswoman, philanthropist, and criminal justice activist. She is a co-owner of the Brooklyn Nets, the New York Liberty, the San Diego Seals, and Barclays Center. She is a founding partner of REFORM Alliance, a nonprofit focused on prison and parole reform in the United States.

Early life and education
Wu Tsai was born in Lawrence, Kansas to Dr. De Min Wu and Chin-Sha Wu, who were immigrants. Her father was a professor of economics at the University of Kansas. Wu Tsai attended Stanford University, receiving both a bachelor of arts degree and a master's degree in international relations in 1988. She later received an MBA from Harvard University in 1993.

Career
Wu Tsai was a senior manager and vice president in the business analysis unit of the finance group at American Express. Wu Tsai also worked for Taobao Hong Kong.

Wu Tsai was a founding partner of REFORM Alliance and sits on the board of directors.

In January 2019, her husband, Joseph Tsai, purchased the Brooklyn Nets and the Nets' arena Barclays Center from Mikhail Prokhorov.

Philanthropy
Wu Tsai and her husband started a foundation, the Joe and Clara Tsai Foundation. Wu Tsai leads and manages the foundation's work in supporting scientific research, economic mobility, social justice, and creativity in the arts. The Stanford University neuroscience institute is named after Wu Tsai.

In August 2020, in the wake of the George Floyd protests, Wu Tsai and her husband donated $50 million to social justice and economic equality initiatives which support Black, Indigenous, and People of Color. The couple developed a five-point action plan and stated that they planned to focus on organizations in Brooklyn, New York.

Wu Tsai and her husband donated to Yale University to create the Wu Tsai Institute, which is set to open in the fall of 2022. The Institute will have three centers: the Center for Neurodevelopment and Plasticity, the Center for Neurocognition and Behavior, and the Center for Neurocomputation and Machine Intelligence.

The Joe and Clara Tsai Foundation also donated to the University of California San Diego’s 21st Century China Center to expand its data-based research, policy engagement, and education on issues related to U.S.-China relations.

In 2021, the Joe and Clara Tsai Foundation funded a Jean-Michel Basquiat educational arts program developed in partnership between the Brooklyn Nets, the New York City Department of Education and the Fund for Public Schools.

Awards
In February 2021, Wu Tsai was named "Champion of Justice" by John Jay College for her role in creating and forming REFORM Alliance. The award also recognized her $50 million donation to create the Social Justice Fund for Brooklyn's Black, Indigenous, and People of Color.

Personal life
Wu Tsai married businessman Joseph Tsai at Park Avenue Christian Church on October 4, 1996. They have three children: Alex, Dash, and Jacob.

Wu Tsai has a residence in La Jolla, California.

References

People from Lawrence, Kansas
Living people
Brooklyn Nets owners
American chief executives
American businesspeople
American philanthropists
Stanford University alumni
Harvard Business School alumni
New York Liberty owners
Stanford University trustees
1966 births